The Komárom-Esztergom County Assembly is the local legislative body of Komárom-Esztergom County in the Central Transdanubia, in Hungary.

Composition

2019
The Assembly elected at the 2019 local government elections, is made up of 15 counselors, with the following party composition:

|-
|colspan=8 align=center| 
|-
! colspan="2" | Party
! Votes
! %
! +/-
! Seats 
! +/-
! Seats %
|-
| bgcolor=| 
| align=left | Fidesz–KDNP
| align=right| 47,823
| align=right| 57.22
| align=right| 4.53
| align=right| 9
| align=right| 0
| align=right| 60.00
|-
| bgcolor=#2D68C4| 
| align=left | DK–Jobbik–MSZP–Momentum–Dialogue
| align=right| 35,752
| align=right| 42.78
| align=right| 
| align=right| 6
| align=right| ±0
| align=right| 40.00
|-
! align=right colspan=2| Total
! align=right| 86,838
! align=right| 100.0
! align=right| 
! align=right| 15
! align=right| 0
! align=right| 
|-
! align=right colspan=2| Voter turnout
! align=right| 
! align=right| 44.72
! align=right| 0.91
! align=right| 
! align=right| 
! align=right| 
|}

After the elections in 2019 the Assembly controlled by the Fidesz–KDNP party alliance which has 9 councillors, 
versus 6 DK-Jobbik-Hungarian Socialist Party (MSZP)-Momentum Movement-Dialogue for Hungary (Párbeszéd) councillors.

List of seat winners

2014
The Assembly elected at the 2014 local government elections, is made up of 15 counselors, with the following party composition:

|-
! colspan="2" | Party
! Votes
! %
! +/-
! Seats 
! +/-
! Seats %
|-
| bgcolor=| 
| align=left | Fidesz–KDNP
| align=right| 43,772
| align=right| 52.69
| align=right| 4.66
| align=right| 9
| align=right| 0
| align=right| 60.00
|-
| bgcolor=| 
| align=left | Jobbik
| align=right| 14,922
| align=right| 17.96
| align=right| 4.48
| align=right| 3
| align=right| 1
| align=right| 20.00
|-
| bgcolor=| 
| align=left | Hungarian Socialist Party (MSZP)
| align=right| 12,435
| align=right| 14.97
| align=right| 11.70
| align=right| 2
| align=right| 2
| align=right| 13.33
|-
| bgcolor=| 
| align=left | Democratic Coalition (DK)
| align=right| 8,065
| align=right| 9.71
| align=right| 
| align=right| 1
| align=right| 1
| align=right| 6.67
|-
! colspan=8|
|-
| bgcolor=#FED500| 
| align=left | Together (Együtt)
| align=right| 3,878
| align=right| 4.67
| align=right| 
| align=right| 0
| align=right| ±0
| align=right| 0
|-
! align=right colspan=2| Total
! align=right| 86,145
! align=right| 100.0
! align=right| 
! align=right| 15
! align=right| 0
! align=right| 
|-
! align=right colspan=2| Voter turnout
! align=right| 
! align=right| 43.81
! align=right| 3.22
! align=right| 
! align=right| 
! align=right| 
|}

After the elections in 2014 the Assembly controlled by the Fidesz–KDNP party alliance which has 9 councillors, versus 3 Jobbik, 2 Hungarian Socialist Party (MSZP) and 1 Democratic Coalition (DK) councillors.

2010
The Assembly elected at the 2010 local government elections, is made up of 15 counselors, with the following party composition:

|-
! colspan="2" | Party
! Votes
! %
! +/-
! Seats 
! +/-
! Seats %
|-
| bgcolor=| 
| align=left | Fidesz–KDNP
| align=right| 51,226
| align=right| 57.35
| align=right| .
| align=right| 9
| align=right| 12
| align=right| 60.00
|-
| bgcolor=| 
| align=left | Hungarian Socialist Party (MSZP)
| align=right| 26,050
| align=right| 29.16
| align=right| .
| align=right| 4
| align=right| 11
| align=right| 26.67
|-
| bgcolor=| 
| align=left | Jobbik
| align=right| 12,044
| align=right| 13.48
| align=right| 
| align=right| 2
| align=right| 2
| align=right| 13.33
|-
! align=right colspan=2| Total
! align=right| 92,899
! align=right| 100.0
! align=right| 
! align=right| 15
! align=right| 25
! align=right| 
|-
! align=right colspan=2| Voter turnout
! align=right| 
! align=right| 47.03
! align=right| 
! align=right| 
! align=right| 
! align=right| 
|}

After the elections in 2010 the Assembly controlled by the Fidesz–KDNP party alliance which has 9 councilors, versus 4 Hungarian Socialist Party (MSZP) and 2 Jobbik councilors.

Presidents of the Assembly
So far, the presidents of the Komárom-Esztergom County Assembly have been:

 1990–1998 György Kovács, Hungarian Socialist Party (MSZP)
 1998–2002 Mózes Lázár, Fidesz
 2002–2006 István Agócs, Hungarian Socialist Party (MSZP)
 2006–2010 Pál Völner, Fidesz–KDNP
 since 2010 György Popovics, Fidesz–KDNP

References

Komárom-Esztergom
Komárom-Esztergom County